Tugah-e Qarah Bas (also Romanized as Tūgah-e Qarah Bas) is a village in Mahur Rural District, Mahvarmilani District, Mamasani County, Fars Province, Iran. At the 2006 census, its population was 48, in 11 families.

References 

Populated places in Mamasani County